The 1877 Birthday Honours were appointments by Queen Victoria to various orders and honours to reward and highlight good works by citizens of the British Empire. The appointments were made to celebrate the official birthday of the Queen, and were published in The London Gazette on 30 May and 2 June 1877.

The recipients of honours are displayed here as they were styled before their new honour, and arranged by honour, with classes (Knight, Knight Grand Cross, etc.) and then divisions (Military, Civil, etc.) as appropriate.

United Kingdom and British Empire

The Most Honourable Order of the Bath

Knight Grand Cross of the Order of the Bath (GCB)

Military Division
Royal Navy
Admiral Sir George Rodney Mundy 

Army
General Sir William Wyllie 
Lieutenant-General Sir Frederick Edward Chapman 
Lieutenant-General Sir Frederick Paul Haines 
Lieutenant-General Sir David Edward Wood 
Major-General Sir John Douglas

Knight Commander of the Order of the Bath (KCB)

Military Division
Royal Navy
Admiral George Elliot
Vice-Admiral Frederick Beauchamp Paget Seymour 
Rear-Admiral William Houston Stewart 

Army
Lieutenant-General Arthur Borton 
Lieutenant-General Richard Waddy 
Lieutenant-General Henry Dalrymple White 
Major-General William Sherbrooke Ramsay Norcott 
Major-General Daniel Lysons 
Major-General Charles Lawrence D'Aguilar 
Major-General James Talbot Airey 
Major-General Alexander Taylor 
Major-General Michael Galwey 
Major-General George Wade Guy Green 
Major-General Thomas Hurdle  late Royal Marines
Inspector-General of Hospital and Fleets William Richard Edwin Smart

Companion of the Order of the Bath (CB)

Military Division
Royal Navy
Rear-Admiral Richard James, Lord Gilford
Captain John Bythesea 
Captain Arthur Wilmshurst
Captain William Gore Jones
Captain George Augustus Cooke Brooker
Captain William Horton
Captain Henry William Hire
Captain Joseph Henry Marryat
Captain Henry Frederick McKillop
Captain Hubert Campion
Captain Edward Hardinge
Captain William Graham
Captain Anthony Hiley Hoskins
Captain Henry Hamilton Beamish

Army
Lieutenant-General John Hamilton Elphinstone Dalrymple
Major-General Alfred Huyshe
Major-General Lord Alexander George Russell
Major-General Charles John Foster
Colonel Edward Seager, Inspecting Officer of Auxiliary Cavalry
Colonel Alexander Cunningham Robertson, Brigade Depot
Colonel Robert Beaufoy Hawley, late 60th Regiment
Colonel George Courtney Vialls, Brigade Depot
Colonel William Charles Robertson Macdonald, Madras Staff Corps
Colonel George Bridges Rodney, Royal Marines
Colonel William Frederick, Lord Abinger, Scots Guards
Colonel James Thomas Walker, Royal (late Bombay) Engineers
Colonel Octavius Edward Rothney  Bengal Staff Corps
Colonel Campbell Claye Grant Ross, Bengal Staff Corps
Captain Robert Calder Allen
Colonel Thomas Casey Lyons, late Brigade Depot
Colonel Alexander James Hardy Elliot
Colonel Robert Biddulph, Royal Artillery
Colonel Charles Cooper Johnson, Bengal Staff Corps
Colonel Osborn Wilkinson, Bengal Cavalry
Colonel Frederick Richard Solly-Flood, 82nd Regiment
Colonel Edward William Bray, 4th Regiment
Colonel Talbot Ashley Cox, 3rd Regiment
Colonel Charles Edward Oldershaw, Royal Artillery
Colonel John Elliott, late Royal Marines
Lieutenant-Colonel James Bevan Edwards, Royal Engineers
Lieutenant-Colonel Henry George Delafosse, 101st Regiment
Lieutenant-Colonel Nevinson Willoughby de Courcy, Royal Marines
Inspector-General of Hospitals and Fleets William Thomas Domville 
Deputy Commissary-General Arthur William Downes

The Most Exalted Order of the Star of India

Knight Grand Commander (GCSI)
Field-Marshal His Royal Highness George William Frederick Charles, Duke of Cambridge

Knight Commander (KCSI)
Joseph Dalton Hooker  Director of the Royal Botanical Gardens at Kew
Thomas Lawrence Seccombe  Financial Secretary to the Secretary of State for India in Council

Companion (CSI)
Colonel George Cliffe Hatch, Bengal Staff Corps Judge Advocate-General, Bengal Army
Lieutenant-Colonel William George Davies, Bengal Staff Corps, Commissioner, Delhi

The Most Distinguished Order of Saint Michael and Saint George

Knight Grand Cross of the Order of St Michael and St George (GCMG)
Field-Marshal His Royal Highness George William Frederick Charles, Duke of Cambridge  Commanding-in-Chief the Forces, to be Grand Master and First or Principal Knight Grand Cross of the said Most Distinguished Order
Field-Marshal His Royal Highness Albert Edward, Prince of Wales 
The Most Honourable the Marquess of Normanby  Governor of the Colony of New Zealand

Knight Commander of the Order of St Michael and St George (KCMG)
Major-General Sir Harry Saint George Ord  Royal Engineers, lately Governor of the Straits Settlements
Sir Redmond Barry  Senior Puisne Judge of the Supreme Court of the Colony of Victoria
Sir Henry Watson Parker  formerly First Minister of the Colony of New South Wales
John Bayley Darvall  formerly Attorney-General of the Colony of New South Wales
Stephen Walcott  Her Majesty's Commissioner for Emigration
William Cleaver Francis Robinson  Governor of the Colony of Western Australia
Major Robert Miller Mundy  lately Lieutenant-Governor of the Colony of British Honduras
Major-General Patrick Leonard MacDougall, Deputy Quartermaster-General, formerly Adjutant-General of the Militia of the Dominion of Canada
Major-General John Henry Lefroy  lately Governor of the Bermuda Islands
Major-General Edward Selby Smyth, Commanding the Militia of the Dominion of Canada
Brigadier-General Robert Michael Laffan, Royal Engineers, Governor of the Bermuda Islands
John Robertson, lately First Minister of the Colony of New South Wales
Henry Parkes, First Minister of the Colony of New South Wales
Arthur Blyth, lately First Minister of the Colony of South Australia
Sir Henry Thurstan Holland  late Assistant Under-Secretary of State for the Colonies
William Wellington Cairns  Governor of the Colony of South Australia
Lieutenant-Colonel Henry Berkeley Fitzhardinge Maxse  Governor of the Island of Heligoland
William Fitzherbert  formerly Colonial Treasurer and Member of the Executive Government and Executive Council of New Zealand, and Special Agent for that Colony

Companion of the Order of St Michael and St George (CMG)
J. Thomas Fitzgerald Callaghan, Governor of the Falkland Islands
William Robinson, Governor of the Bahama Islands
Hudson Ralph Janisch, Governor of the Island of Saint Helena
George Dundas, Lieutenant-Governor of the Island of Saint Vincent
George William Des Vœux, Administrator of the Government of the Island of Saint Lucia
Frederick Palgrave Barlee, Lieutenant-Governor of the Colony of British Honduras
Joseph Trutch, lately Lieutenant-Governor of the Province of British Columbia
Cyril Clerke Graham, Lieutenant-Governor of the Island of Grenada
John Douglas, First Minister of the Colony of Queensland
Edwin Donald Baynes, Colonial Secretary for the Leeward Islands
John Scott Bushe, Colonial Secretary for the Island of Trinidad
William Alexander George Young, Government Secretary for the Colony of British Guiana
Gustave Barthélémy Colin, lately Procureur and Advocate-General of the Island of Mauritius
Frederick Napier Broome, Colonial Secretary for the Colony of Natal
Alexander Wilson Moir, President of the Island of Saint Christopher
John d'Auvergne Dumaresq, Colonial Secretary for the Gold Coast Colony
George Vane, Treasurer of the Island of Ceylon
Thomas Russell, formerly Defence Minister of the Colony of New Zealand
James Henry Keens, formerly President of the Privy Council of the Island of Tobago
John Smith, President of the Council of Education for the Colony of New South Wales
Alexander Murray, Director of the Geological Survey of the Island of Newfoundland
Sandford Fleming, Royal Engineers, Engineer-in-Chief of the Canadian Pacific Railway
John Palliser, lately in Command of an Expedition sent by the Government of Canada to the Rocky Mountains
Major Donald R. Cameron  lately Chief Officer of the British Boundary Commission, Canada
Captain Samuel Anderson, Royal Engineers, lately Chief Astronomer of the British Boundary Commission, Canada
Captain George Arthur French  formerly Commissioner of the North-West Police, Canada
Donald Currie 
Captain Louis Frederick Knollys, late of Her Majesty's 32nd Regiment of Foot, lately Commanding Armed Constabulary in the Colony of Fiji
Arthur J. L. Gordon, Private Secretary to the Governor of the Colony of Fiji
Cornelius Hendricksen Kortright, Governor of the Colony of British Guiana
Lieutenant-Colonel William Grossman, R.E., lately Her Majesty's Commissioner of Enquiry into the Financial Affairs of the Province of Griqua Land West
Henry Lushington Phillips, Puisne Judge of the Supreme Court of the Colony of Natal, and lately Acting Chief Justice for the Island of Barbados
Colonel Antonio Mattel, R.M.F.A., for many years Lieutenant-Colonel in Command of the Royal Malta Fencible Artillery

References

Birthday Honours
1877 awards
1877 in Australia
1877 in Canada
1877 in India
1877 in the United Kingdom